The Gods Themselves is a 1972 science fiction novel written by Isaac Asimov, and his first original work in the science fiction genre in fifteen years (not counting his 1966 novelization of Fantastic Voyage). It won the Nebula Award for Best Novel in 1972, and the Hugo Award for Best Novel in 1973.

The book is divided into three main parts, which were first published in Galaxy Magazine and Worlds of If as three consecutive stories.

Overview
The book is divided into three sections; the first set on the Earth, the second set on a planet in a parallel universe, and the third set on a lunar colony.

In the first section, the book opens at chapter six to give context to the other chapters, and alternates timelines. Thus, the flow is Chapter six overview of Chapter one, then Chapter one. Next, is Chapter six overview of Chapter two, then Chapter two. Following chapter three to five, chapter six then concludes, and the story proceeds with chapter seven.

The main plot-line is a project by those who inhabit a parallel universe (the para-Universe) with different physical laws from this one. By exchanging matter from their universe—para-Universe—with our universe, they seek to exploit the differences in physical laws. The exchange of matter provides an alternative source of energy to maintain their universe. However, the exchange will likely result in the collapse of the Earth's Sun into a supernova, and possibly even turning a large part of the Milky Way into a quasar. There is hope among those in the para-Universe that the energy explosion does happen in our universe.

Timeline
In Part I, the novel specifically refers to the date October 3, 2070, as a date when the character Hallam entered the laboratory to work. Later in Part I, in chapter two, the book states that the character Peter Lamont had been two years old when Hallam performed the work set in 2070, and Lamont was 25 years old when he began working at the Pump Station. Accordingly, the bulk of the novel is set sometime around the year 2093. In Part III, the novel states that the Earth's population has been reduced to two billion people following a "Great Crisis". It caused significant ecological damage, with all apes except for gibbons extinct outside of zoos, and technological progress being viewed with suspicion – for example, genetic engineering research is banned outright. Part III of the novel takes place on a lunar colony with about 20,000 people, half of which were "native Lunarites". The colony is stated to be the last leftover of pre-Crisis humanity, making it the leader in many sciences.

Plot summary

First part: Against Stupidity...
The first part takes place on Earth, almost a century after the "Great Crisis", where ecological and economic collapse reduced the world's population from six billion to two billion.  The timeline alternates between the events of the 2070s, outlining the discovery of the "electron pump," and events twenty-three years later.

Radiochemist Frederick Hallam discovers that a container's contents have been altered. He finds out that the sample, originally tungsten, has been transformed into plutonium 186—an isotope that cannot occur naturally in our universe. As this is investigated, Hallam gets the credit for suggesting that the matter has been exchanged by beings in a parallel universe; this leads to the development of a cheap, clean, and apparently endless source of energy: the "Pump", which transfers matter between our universe (where plutonium 186 decays into tungsten 186) and a parallel one governed by different physical laws (where tungsten 186 turns into plutonium 186), yielding a nuclear reaction in the process. The development process grants Hallam high position in public opinion; winning him power, position, and a Nobel Prize.

Physicist Peter Lamont, while writing a history of the Pump about 25 years later, comes to believe that the impetus of the Pump was the effort of the extraterrestrial "para-men". Lamont enlists the help of Myron "Mike" Bronowski, an archeologist and linguist known for translating ancient writings in the Etruscan language, to prove his claim by communicating with the parallel world. They inscribe symbols on strips of tungsten to establish a common written language as the strips are exchanged for ones made of plutonium-186. As Bronowski works, Lamont discovers that the Pump increases the strong nuclear force inside the sun, and thus threatens both universes by the explosion of Earth's Sun and the cooling of that in the parallel universe. Bronowski receives an acknowledgment from the parallel universe that the Pump may be dangerous. Lamont attempts to demonstrate this to a politician and several members of the scientific community, but they refuse his request. Lamont decides to tell the para-men to stop the use of the Pump, but Bronowski reveals that they have been in contact not with the other side's authorities, but with dissidents unable to stop the Pump on their side. The last message was them begging Earth to stop.

Second part: ...The Gods Themselves...
The second part is set in the parallel universe in which, because the nuclear force is stronger, stars are smaller and burn out faster than in our universe. It takes place on a world orbiting a sun that is dying. Because atoms behave differently in this universe, substances can move through each other and appear to occupy the same space. This gives the intelligent beings unique abilities. Time itself appears to flow differently in this universe: the events take place in an apparently short space of time in the lives of the inhabitants, while more than 20 years pass in our universe, and a long feeding break of one of the characters translates into a two-week gap on Lamont's side.

Like the first part of the novel, this section has an unusual chapter numbering. Each chapter except the last is in three parts, named "1a", "1b", and "1c". Each reflects the viewpoint of one of the three members of the "triad" central to the story's theme.

The inhabitants are of two types: the dominant "hard ones," whose bodies are solid and of a fixed shape, and the more fluid "soft ones", whose bodies are mutable. The latter have three sexes with fixed roles for each sex:
 Rationals (or "lefts") are the logical and scientific sex; identified with masculine pronouns and producing a form of sperm. They have limited ability to pass through other bodies.
 Emotionals (or "mids") are the intuitive sex; identified with the feminine pronouns and provide the energy needed for reproduction. Emotionals can thin themselves to pass in and out of solid material, including rock.
 Parentals (or "rights") bear and raise the offspring, and are identified with masculine pronouns.  Parentals have almost no ability to blend their bodies with others, except when helped by one or both of the other sexes.

All three 'genders' are embedded in sexual and social norms of expected and acceptable behavior. All three live by photosynthesis; whereas sexual intercourse is accomplished by bodily collapse into a single pool (known as 'melting'). Rationals and Parentals can do this independently, but in the presence of an Emotional, the "melt" becomes total, which causes orgasm and also results in a period of unconsciousness and memory loss. Only during such a total "melt" can the Rational "impregnate" the Parental, with the Emotional providing the energy. Normally, the triad produces three children; a Rational, a Parental and Emotional (in that order), after which they "pass on" and disappear forever. In the past, some triads have repeated the cycle of births (thus ensuring population growth), but the declining amount of solar radiation no longer allows that. "Stone-rubbing" is a practice of partially melting with solid objects like rocks, possible for Emotionals, but the other genders are only capable of it in a very limited form. It is an analogue of human masturbation and generally frowned upon. Dua, the Emotional who functions as protagonist of this section of the book, appears to be the only one who practices it while married.

The hard ones regulate much of soft one society, allocating one of each sex to a mating group called a "triad," and acting as mentors to the Rationals. Little is shown of "hard one" society; whereas Dua suspects that the "hard ones" are a dying race, retaining the "soft ones" as a replacement for their absent children. This is dismissed by Odeen, the Rational of Dua's triad. Having the most contact with the "hard ones," Odeen has heard them speak of a new "hard one" called Estwald, accounted of exceptional intelligence and the creator of the Pump.

Dua is an oddball Emotional who exhibits traits normally associated with Rationals, resulting in the nickname "left-em." While being taught by Odeen, she also discovers the supernova problem that Lamont uncovered in the first section. Outraged that the Pump is allowed to operate, she attempts to halt it but cannot persuade her own species to abandon the Pump. Given that their own sun and all the other stars in their universe can no longer provide the energy necessary for reproduction, they consider the possible destruction of Earth's Sun worthwhile if it might provide a more reliable source of energy.

Driven by an innate desire to procreate, Tritt, the "Parental" of the triad, at first asks Odeen to persuade Dua to facilitate the production of their third child. When this fails, Tritt steals an energy-battery from the Pump and rigs it to feed Dua, which stimulates the triad into a total melt, resulting in conception. Dua discovers this betrayal and escapes to the caves of the hard ones, where she transmits the warning messages received by Lamont. This effort nearly exhausts her mortally before she is found by her triad. Here it is revealed that the hard ones are not a separate species, but the fully mature form that the triads eventually coalesce into permanently. Each melt briefly allows the triad to shift into its hard form during the period they can't later remember. Odeen convinces Dua that the hard one they will become will have influence with the others to stop the Pump; but as their final metamorphosis (the true meaning of "passing on") begins, Dua realizes (too late to prevent irreversible union) that her own triad's "hard" form is the scientist Estwald.

Third part: ...Contend in Vain?
The third part of the novel takes place on the Moon. Lunar society is diverging radically from that of Earth. The lower gravity has produced people with a very different physique.  Their food supply is manufactured from algae and distasteful to inhabitants of Earth. They enjoy low-gravity sports that would be impossible on Earth, such as an acrobatic game like "tag" performed in a huge cylinder (these sports are vital to them, since their metabolism is still that of Earthmen, and proper strenuous exercise must be maintained for it to function properly). Some Lunarites want to further adapt their bodies to life on the Moon, but Earth has outlawed genetic engineering decades ago. Lunarites are beginning to see themselves as a separate race, although procreation between them and Earth people is quite common. Sex, however, is problematic, since an Earthborn person is likely to injure his or her partner due to loss of control. Sexual morals are loose, and nudity is not taboo.

The plot centers on a cynical middle-aged ex-physicist named Denison, briefly introduced in Part 1 as the colleague and rival of Hallam whose snide remark drove Hallam to investigate the change in his sample of tungsten and, eventually, develop the Pump. Finding his career blocked by Hallam, Denison leaves science and enters the business world, becoming a success.

Denison, independently of Lamont, had deduced the danger in the Electron Pump. He visits the Moon colony hoping to work outside of Hallam's influence using technology that the Lunarites have developed. He is helped by a Lunarite tourist guide named Selene Lindstrom. She is secretly an Intuitionist (a genetically engineered human with superhuman intuition), who is working with her lover, Barron Neville. They are both part of a group of political agitators who want independence from Earth. The group particularly wants to be allowed to research ways to use the Electron Pump on the Moon.  Although solar energy is plentiful enough to power their underground habitats, Neville wants to live entirely underground and never have to venture out on the surface. With the scientists' help, Denison gets access to the technology and proves that the strong force is indeed increasing, and will cause the Sun to explode.

Denison continues his work, tapping into a third parallel universe that is in a pre-Big Bang state (called "cosmic egg" or "cosmeg"), where physical laws are totally opposite to those of Dua's universe.  Matter from the cosmeg starts with very weak nuclear force, and then spontaneously fuses as our universe's physical laws take over. The exchange with the second parallel universe both produces more energy at little or no cost, and balances the changes from the Electron Pump, resulting in a return to equilibrium. However, Selene clandestinely conducts another test showing that momentum can also be exchanged with the cosmeg. Denison catches her and forces her to admit her secret purpose: Neville thinks the momentum exchange can be used to move anything without using rockets, including the Moon itself; he wants to break away from Earth in the most complete way possible. Denison is appalled, although he sees the potential of the technology to make travel within the Solar System easier, and to the stars possible.

When Selene discusses Neville's plan with the rest of the group, most of them agree that moving the entire Moon will be meaningless, and building self-sufficient sublight starships will be better. A later public vote goes against Neville as well. Hallam is ruined by Denison's revelations. Selene and Denison become a couple. Having received permission to conceive a second child, Selene requests Denison to become its father. The novel ends with them deciding to try working around the sexual incompatibility problem.

Asimov's relationship to the story

In a letter of February 12, 1982, Asimov identified this as his favorite science fiction novel. Asimov's short story "Gold", one of the last he wrote in his life, describes the efforts of fictional computer animators to create a "compu-drama" from the novel's second section.

Asimov took the names of the immature aliens—Odeen, Dua, and Tritt—from the words One, Two, and Three in the language of his native Russia, i.e. odin (один), dva (два) and tri (три).

Asimov's inspiration for the title of the book, and its three sections, was a quotation from the play The Maid of Orleans by Friedrich Schiller: "Mit der Dummheit kämpfen Götter selbst vergebens.", "Against stupidity the gods themselves contend in vain" (quoted in the book itself). 

Asimov describes a conversation in January 1971 when Robert Silverberg had to refer to an isotope—just an arbitrary one—as an example. Silverberg said "plutonium-186". "There is no such isotope", said Asimov, "and such a one can't exist either". Silverberg dared Asimov to write a story about it. Later Asimov figured out under what conditions plutonium-186 could exist, and what complications and consequences it might imply. Asimov reasoned that it must belong to another universe with other physical laws; specifically, different nuclear forces necessary to allow a Pu-186 nucleus to hold itself together. He wrote down these ideas, intending to write a short story, but his editor, Larry Ashmead, asked him to expand it into a full novel. As a result of that request, Asimov wrote the second and third parts of the book.

In his autobiography, Asimov stated that the novel, especially the second section, was the "biggest and most effective over-my-head writing [that I] ever produced".

References to science
At the time of writing, quasars had been only recently discovered and were not well understood. In the story Lamont suggests that quasars are in fact parts of galaxies that have undergone sudden increase in the strength of the strong nuclear force, resulting in an explosion of fusion energy. It is not certain if Asimov took into account the nature of solar fusion, where the primary reaction rate is governed by the weak nuclear force, transforming protons into neutrons, while the strong force governs the amount of energy released during reactions.

The book mentions quarks, but confines its discussion of the strong force to pions, which are the carriers of the force that binds protons and neutrons together, while gluons bind quarks within protons and neutrons. At the time, gluons were only suspected to exist while particles thought to be quarks had been observed directly.

Similarly, the Etruscan language and particularly Etruscan writings had not yet been translated and were enigmatic. As of 2022, the language's possible relation to any other known language remains unproven.  The character Bronowski is imagined to have solved the puzzle by considering the Basque language, which is also unique in Europe, as a relative of ancient Etruscan. Bronowski decides to help Lamont when the president of the university refers to the language as "Itascan", confusing it with Lake Itasca.  He resolves to do something that "even that idiot will remember".

References

External links

The Gods Themselves at Worlds Without End

1972 American novels
1972 science fiction novels
American science fiction novels
Doubleday (publisher) books
Hard science fiction
Hugo Award for Best Novel-winning works
Nebula Award for Best Novel-winning works
Science fiction novels by Isaac Asimov
Nonlinear narrative novels